The 1999–2000 La Liga season, the 69th since its establishment, began on 21 August 1999 and ended on 20 May 2000. Deportivo La Coruña won their first league title with 69 points, the lowest for a champion since three points for a win was introduced in 1995.

Promotion and relegation 
Twenty teams competed in the league – the top sixteen teams from the previous season and the three teams promoted from the Segunda División. The promoted teams were Málaga, Numancia, Sevilla and Rayo Vallecano. Sevilla and Rayo Vallecano returned to the top flight after an absence of two years while Málaga CF and Numancia were promoted for the first time. However, since CD Málaga played in the 1989–90 La Liga, the city of Málaga returned to the top fight after an absence of nine years. They replaced Extremadura, Villarreal (both teams relegated after a season's presence), Tenerife (ending their top flight spell of eleven years) and Salamanca (ending their top flight spell of two years).

Team information

Personnel and kits

Clubs and locations 

1999–2000 season was composed of the following clubs:

Managerial changes

League table

Results 
The season results are as follows:

Overall 
 Most wins – Deportivo La Coruña (21)
 Fewest wins – Sevilla (5)
 Most draws – Racing Santander (16)
 Fewest draws – Deportivo La Coruña (6)
 Most losses – Sevilla (20)
 Fewest losses – Zaragoza (7)
 Most goals scored – Barcelona (70)
 Fewest goals scored – Betis (33)
 Most goals conceded – Sevilla (67)
 Fewest goals conceded – Alavés (37)

Awards and season statistics

Top goalscorers 

Source: BDFutbol

Zamora Trophy

Fair Play award 
Rayo Vallecano was the winner of the Fair-play award with 102 points, moreover it was elected on 8 June 2000 in Brussels as one of the two entries by UEFA to enter UEFA Cup in the qualifying round by the same condition of Fair Play.

 Source: El Mundo Deportivo (newspaper archive, web)

Pedro Zaballa award 
Alfonso Pérez, footballer

Signings 
Source: http://www.bdfutbol.com/es/t/t1999-00.html

See also 
 1999–2000 Segunda División
 1999–2000 Copa del Rey

References 

La Liga seasons
1999–2000 in Spanish football leagues
Spain